Liceo Mercedes Urzúa Díaz is a Chilean primary and secondary school (up to Segundo medio) located in Paredones, Cardenal Caro Province, Chile.

As of 2012, it has 269 students. Twenty teachers work in the institution. The principal of Liceo Mercedes Urzúa Díaz is Flavio Rojas Acosta, and the president of the parents' center (centro de padres) is Ricardo Muñoz Ulloa.

References 

Educational institutions with year of establishment missing
Primary schools in Chile
Secondary schools in Chile
Schools in Cardenal Caro Province